Sake is a Japanese alcoholic beverage brewed from rice.

Sake may also refer to:

Places
 Sake, Democratic Republic of the Congo, a town in the eastern province of North Kivu
 Sake, Rwanda, a town in Rwanda

Other uses
 Sake, a Japanese word for salmon commonly used in sushi and other Japanese dishes
 Sake, meaning sheikh, an honorific title in the Arabic language
 Sake language, a Bantu language spoken in Gabon
 Sake Dean Mahomed (1759–1851)

See also
 Saker (disambiguation)
 Saki (disambiguation)
 Sakić, a surname